Ivan Šola (born December 12, 1961) is a Croatian bobsledder who has competed since 1999. Competing in three Winter Olympics, he earned his best finish of 20th in the four-man event at Vancouver in 2010.

Šola also competed in the FIBT World Championships, earning his best finish of 24th in the four-man event at Calgary in 2005.

Prior to his bobsleigh career, Šola was a multiple Croatian champion in motorcycle racing. In 2003 Šola also competed in Formula 2000 speedboat races. , he was an owner of a motorcycle shop and a driving school. In 2007 he was elected member of the board of the Croatian Motorcycling Federation.

, Šola is the president of the Croatian Bobsleigh and Skeleton Federation.

References

External links
 
 Ivan Sola profile at Sports-Reference.com
 

1961 births
Bobsledders at the 2002 Winter Olympics
Bobsledders at the 2006 Winter Olympics
Bobsledders at the 2010 Winter Olympics
Croatian male bobsledders
Croatian motorcycle racers
Living people
Olympic bobsledders of Croatia
Sportspeople from Split, Croatia
Croatian sports executives and administrators